Christopher Caisey (born December 1, 1985) is a Bermudian footballer who currently plays for Hamilton Parish FC.

Club career
Caisey played for Bermuda Hogges in the USL Premier Development League. He was captain at Devonshire Cougars before skippering Hamilton.

International career
He made his debut for Bermuda in an October 2011 FIFA World Cup qualification match against Trinidad and Tobago, his sole international game.

References

External links
 

1985 births
Living people
Bermudian footballers
Bermuda international footballers
Bermuda Hogges F.C. players
USL League Two players
Association football midfielders